Fadjur, Foaled April 12, 1952, died 1983, was an Arabian horse who was bred in Spokane, Washington and resided in Stockton, California. A bay stallion, he was nicknamed "The Fabulous Fadjur" and sired numerous progeny from the Jack Tone Ranch over a thirty-year period.

He was a prolific breeder of champion horses, and is the maternal grandsire of Khemosabi.

Pedigree

Notes

References

 

Individual Arabian and part-Arabian horses
1952 animal births
1983 animal deaths